The Dresden Jr. Kings are a junior ice hockey team based in Dresden, Ontario, Canada.  They play in the Provincial Junior Hockey League of the Ontario Hockey Association and Hockey Canada.  The Kings won the Clarence Schmalz Cup in 1971 at Ontario Provincial Junior C Champions.

History

Founded in 1959, the Kings started out in the first Border Cities Junior "B" Hockey League.  In the 1960s they spent some time in the Bluewater Junior "C" Hockey League after the first BCJHL folded.  When the second BCJHL came around, they were back on board.  In 1971, the league became the Great Lakes Junior Hockey League.  They, with the Blenheim Blades have been with the league all along.  The 1971 season saw the GLJHL play as both a Junior "B" and "C" league.  The top 3 teams went on to the Ontario Hockey Association Junior "B" playoffs, while the 4th and 5th place teams played off for the league's first Junior "C" title and a birth into the Clarence Schmalz Cup playdowns.  The Kings made quick work of the GLJHL playoffs and in the end, possibly aided by the regular season battles against the Petrolia Jets and the Windsor Royals, won the Clarence Schmalz Cup.

Season-by-season record

2019–20 team staff
General Manager - Chris Dawson
Assistant manager - 
Head coach - Tom VanEerd
Assistant coach - Dan Veenema
Assistant coach - Shawn Simpson
Assistant coach - Norm Logan
Trainer - Scott Syrie
Assistant Equipment Manager - Randy DeWael

Clarence Schmalz Cup appearances
1971: Dresden Jr. Kings defeated Bowmanville Eagles 4-games-to-3

Notable alumni
Dave Kelly
Brian Wiseman

External links
Dresden Jr. Kings 

Great Lakes Junior C Hockey League teams